Classified X is a 1998 French-US documentary movie written by Melvin Van Peebles, directed by Mark Daniels and narrated by Van Peebles, that details the history of black people in American cinema throughout the 20th century. According to the review in Variety: 

The documentary includes footage from the following movies:
 The Palm Beach Story
 Africa Screams
 The Birth of a Nation
 Casablanca
 Cry Freedom
 The Defiant Ones
 Gone with the Wind
 Guess Who's Coming to Dinner
 The Jazz Singer
 Shaft (1971)

References

External links
 Classified X (1998) at IMDb
 Classified X (1998) at Allmovie

American documentary films
Documentary films about African Americans
Documentary films about the cinema of the United States
1998 films
1998 documentary films
1990s American films